The Judith A. Markowitz Award for Exceptional New LGBTQ Writers, formerly known as the Dr. Betty Berzon Emerging Writer Award and established in 2013, is an annual literary award presented by the Lambda Literary Foundation. The award is granted to "LGBTQ-identified writers whose work demonstrates their strong potential for promising careers." The writers must "have published at least one but no more than two books of fiction, nonfiction or poetry." Two annual winners each receive a $2,500 cash prize.

Recipients

References

See also 

 Betty Berzon Emerging Writer Award

Lambda Literary Awards
Awards established in 2013
English-language literary awards
Lists of LGBT-related award winners and nominees